This is a list of the National Register of Historic Places listings in Concho County, Texas.

This is intended to be a complete list of properties listed on the National Register of Historic Places in Concho County, Texas. There are four properties listed on the National Register in the county. One property is both a State Antiquities Landmark and a Recorded Texas Historic Landmark.

Current listings

The publicly disclosed locations of National Register properties may be seen in a mapping service provided.

|}

See also

National Register of Historic Places listings in Texas
Recorded Texas Historic Landmarks in Concho County

References

External links

Concho County, Texas
Concho County
Buildings and structures in Concho County, Texas